Konstantin Eduardovich Tsiolkovsky (– 19 September 1935) was a Russian and Soviet rocket scientist who pioneered astronautics. Along with the Frenchman Robert Esnault-Pelterie, the  Germans Hermann Oberth and Fritz von Opel, and the American Robert H. Goddard, he is one of the founding fathers of modern rocketry and astronautics. His works later inspired leading Soviet rocket-engineers Sergei Korolev and Valentin Glushko, who contributed to the success of the Soviet space program.

A recluse by nature, his unusual habits made him seem bizarre to his fellow townsfolk.

Early life
Tsiolkovsky was born in Izhevskoye (now in Spassky District, Ryazan Oblast), in the Russian Empire, to a middle-class family. His father, Makary Edward Erazm Ciołkowski, was a Polish forester of Roman Catholic faith who relocated to Russia; his Russian Orthodox mother was of mixed Volga Tatar  and Russian origin. His father was successively a forester, teacher, and minor government official.  At the age of 10, Konstantin caught scarlet fever and lost his hearing. When he was 13, his mother died. He was not admitted to elementary schools because of his hearing problem, so he was self-taught. As a reclusive home-schooled child, he passed much of his time by reading books and became interested in mathematics and physics. As a teenager, he began to contemplate the possibility of space travel.

Tsiolkovsky spent three years attending a Moscow library, where Russian cosmism proponent Nikolai Fyodorov worked. He later came to believe that colonizing space would lead to the perfection of the human species, with immortality and a carefree existence.

Additionally, inspired by the fiction of Jules Verne, Tsiolkovsky theorized many aspects of space travel and rocket propulsion. He is considered the father of spaceflight and the first person to conceive the space elevator, becoming inspired in 1895 by the newly constructed Eiffel Tower in Paris.

Despite the youth's growing knowledge of physics, his father was concerned that he would not be able to provide for himself financially as an adult and brought him back home at the age of 19 after learning that he was overworking himself and going hungry. Afterwards, Tsiolkovsky passed the teacher's exam and went to work at a school in Borovsk near Moscow. He also met and married his wife Varvara Sokolova during this time. Despite being stuck in Kaluga, a small town far from major learning centers, Tsiolkovsky managed to make scientific discoveries on his own.

The first two decades of the 20th century were marred by personal tragedy. Tsiolkovsky's son Ignaty committed suicide in 1902, and in 1908 many of his accumulated papers were lost in a flood. In 1911, his daughter Lyubov was arrested for engaging in revolutionary activities.

Scientific achievements
Tsiolkovsky stated that he developed the theory of rocketry only as a supplement to philosophical research on the subject. He wrote more than 400 works including approximately 90 published pieces on space travel and related subjects. Among his works are designs for rockets with steering thrusters, multistage boosters, space stations, airlocks for exiting a spaceship into the vacuum of space, and closed-cycle biological systems to provide food and oxygen for space colonies.

Tsiolkovsky's first scientific study dates back to 1880–1881. He wrote a paper called "Theory of Gases," in which he outlined the basis of the kinetic theory of gases, but after submitting it to the Russian Physico-Chemical Society (RPCS), he was informed that his discoveries had already been made 25 years earlier. Undaunted, he pressed ahead with his second work, "The Mechanics of the Animal Organism". It received favorable feedback, and Tsiolkovsky was made a member of the Society. Tsiolkovsky's main works after 1884 dealt with four major areas: the scientific rationale for the all-metal balloon (airship), streamlined airplanes and trains, hovercraft, and rockets for interplanetary travel.

In 1892, he was transferred to a new teaching post in Kaluga where he continued to experiment. During this period, Tsiolkovsky began working on a problem that would occupy much of his time during the coming years: an attempt to build an all-metal dirigible that could be expanded or shrunk in size.

Tsiolkovsky developed the first aerodynamics laboratory in Russia in his apartment. In 1897, he built the first Russian wind tunnel with an open test section and developed a method of experimentation using it. In 1900, with a grant from the Academy of Sciences, he made a survey using models of the simplest shapes and determined the drag coefficients of the sphere, flat plates, cylinders, cones, and other bodies. Tsiolkovsky's work in the field of aerodynamics was a source of ideas for Russian scientist Nikolay Zhukovsky, the father of modern aerodynamics and hydrodynamics. Tsiolkovsky described the airflow around bodies of different geometric shapes, but because the RPCS did not provide any financial support for this project, he was forced to pay for it largely out of his own pocket.

Tsiolkovsky studied the mechanics of lighter-than-air powered flying machines. He first proposed the idea of an all-metal dirigible and built a model of it. The first printed work on the airship was "A Controllable Metallic Balloon" (1892), in which he gave the scientific and technical rationale for the design of an airship with a metal sheath. Tsiolkovsky was not supported on the airship project, and the author was refused a grant to build the model. An appeal to the General Aviation Staff of the Russian army also had no success. In 1892, he turned to the new and unexplored field of heavier-than-air aircraft. Tsiolkovsky's idea was to build an airplane with a metal frame. In the article "An Airplane or a Birdlike (Aircraft) Flying Machine" (1894) are descriptions and drawings of a monoplane, which in its appearance and aerodynamics anticipated the design of aircraft that would be constructed 15 to 18 years later. In an Aviation Airplane, the wings have a thick profile with a rounded front edge and the fuselage is faired. But work on the airplane, as well as on the airship, did not receive recognition from the official representatives of Russian science, and Tsiolkovsky's further research had neither monetary nor moral support. In 1914, he displayed his models of all-metal dirigibles at the Aeronautics Congress in St. Petersburg but met with a lukewarm response.

Disappointed at this, Tsiolkovsky gave up on space and aeronautical problems with the onset of World War I and instead turned his attention to the problem of alleviating poverty. This occupied his time during the war years until the Russian Revolution in 1917.

Starting in 1896, Tsiolkovsky systematically studied the theory of motion of rocket apparatus. Thoughts on the use of the rocket principle in the cosmos were expressed by him as early as 1883, and a rigorous theory of rocket propulsion was developed in 1896. Tsiolkovsky derived the formula, which he called the "formula of aviation", now known as Tsiolkovsky rocket equation, establishing the relationship between:
 change in the rocket's speed
 exhaust velocity of the engine
 initial and final mass of the rocket

After writing out this equation, Tsiolkovsky recorded the date: 10 May 1897. In the same year, the formula for the motion of a body of variable mass was published in the thesis of the Russian mathematician I. V. Meshchersky ("Dynamics of a Point of Variable Mass," I. V. Meshchersky, St. Petersburg, 1897).

His most important work, published in May 1903, was Exploration of Outer Space by Means of Rocket Devices. Tsiolkovsky calculated, using the Tsiolkovsky equation, that the horizontal speed required for a minimal orbit around the Earth is 8,000 m/s (5 miles per second) and that this could be achieved by means of a multistage rocket fueled by liquid oxygen and liquid hydrogen. In the article "Exploration of Outer Space by Means of Rocket Devices", it was suggested for the first time that a rocket could perform space flight. In this article and its sequels (1911 and 1914), he developed some ideas of missiles and considered the use of liquid rocket engines.

The outward appearance of Tsiolkovsky's spacecraft design, published in 1903, was a basis for modern spaceship design.  The design had a hull divided into three main sections. The pilot and copilot were in the first section, the second and third sections held the liquid oxygen and liquid hydrogen needed to fuel the spacecraft.

However, the result of the first publication was not what Tsiolkovsky expected. No foreign scientists appreciated his research, which today is a major scientific discipline. In 1911, he published the second part of the work "Exploration of Outer Space by Means of Rocket Devices". Here Tsiolkovsky evaluated the work needed to overcome the force of gravity, determined the speed needed to propel the device into the solar system ("escape velocity"), and examined calculation of flight time. The publication of this article made a splash in the scientific world,  and Tsiolkovsky found many friends among his fellow scientists.

In 1926–1929, roughly at the same time when Fritz von Opel's rocket-powered Opel RAK land vehicles and aircraft were demonstrated to the public, Tsiolkovsky solved the practical problem regarding the role played by rocket fuel in getting to escape velocity and leaving the Earth. He showed that the final speed of the rocket depends on the rate of gas flowing from it and on how the weight of the fuel relates to the weight of the empty rocket.

Tsiolkovsky conceived a number of ideas that have been later used in rockets. They include: gas rudders (graphite) for controlling a rocket's flight and changing the trajectory of its center of mass, the use of components of the fuel to cool the outer shell of the spacecraft (during re-entry to Earth) and the walls of the combustion chamber and nozzle, a pump system for feeding the fuel components, the optimal descent trajectory of the spacecraft while returning from space, etc. In the field of rocket propellants, Tsiolkovsky studied a large number of different oxidizers and combustible fuels and recommended specific pairings: liquid oxygen and hydrogen, and oxygen with hydrocarbons. Tsiolkovsky did much fruitful work on the creation of the theory of jet aircraft, and invented his chart Gas Turbine Engine.  In 1927, he published the theory and design of a train on an air cushion. He first proposed a "bottom of the retractable body" chassis. However, space flight and the airship were the main problems to which he devoted his life. Tsiolkovsky had been developing the idea of the hovercraft since 1921, publishing a fundamental paper on it in 1927, entitled "Air Resistance and the Express Train". In 1929, Tsiolkovsky proposed the construction of multistage rockets in his book Space Rocket Trains.

Tsiolkovsky championed the idea of the diversity of life in the universe and was the first theorist and advocate of human spaceflight.

Tsiolkovsky never built a rocket; he apparently did not expect many of his theories to ever be implemented.

Hearing problems did not prevent the scientist from having a good understanding of music, as outlined in his work "The Origin of Music and Its Essence."

Later life

Tsiolkovsky supported the Bolshevik Revolution, and eager to promote science and technology, the new Soviet government elected him a member of the Socialist Academy in 1918. He worked as a high school mathematics teacher until retiring in 1920 at the age of 63. In 1921, he received a lifetime pension.

In his late lifetime Tsiolkovsky was honored for his pioneering work. However, from the mid 1920s onwards the importance of his other work was acknowledged, and he was honoured for it and the Soviet state provided financial backing for his research. He was initially popularized in Soviet Russia in 1931–1932 mainly by two writers: Yakov Perelman and Nikolai Rynin. Tsiolkovsky died in Kaluga on 19 September 1935 after undergoing an operation for stomach cancer. He bequeathed his life's work to the Soviet state.

Legacy
Tsiolkovsky influenced later rocket scientists throughout Europe, like Wernher von Braun. Soviet search teams at Peenemünde found a German translation of a book by Tsiolkovsky of which "almost every page...was embellished by von Braun's comments and notes." Leading Soviet rocket-engine designer Valentin Glushko and rocket designer Sergey Korolev studied Tsiolkovsky's works as youths, and both sought to turn Tsiolkovsky's theories into reality. In particular, Korolev saw traveling to Mars as the more important priority, until in 1964 he decided to compete with the American Project Apollo for the Moon.

In 1989, Tsiolkovsky was inducted into the International Air & Space Hall of Fame at the San Diego Air & Space Museum.

Philosophical work

Tsiolkovsky wrote a book called The Will of the Universe: The Unknown Intelligence in 1928 in which he propounded a philosophy of panpsychism.  He believed humans would eventually colonize the Milky Way galaxy. His thought preceded the Space Age by several decades, and some of what he foresaw in his imagination has come into being since his death. Tsiolkovsky also did not believe in traditional religious cosmology, but instead (and to the chagrin of the Soviet authorities) he believed in a cosmic being that governed humans as "marionettes, mechanical puppets, machines, movie characters", thereby adhering to a mechanical view of the universe, which he believed would be controlled in the millennia to come through the power of human science and industry. In a short article in 1933, he explicitly formulated what was later to be known as the Fermi paradox.

He wrote a few works on ethics, espousing negative utilitarianism.

Tributes

 In 1964, The Monument to the Conquerors of Space was erected to celebrate the achievements of the Soviet people in space exploration. Located in Moscow, the monument is 107 meters (350 feet) tall and covered with titanium cladding. The main part of the monument is a giant obelisk topped by a rocket and resembling in shape the exhaust plume of the rocket. A statue of Konstantin Tsiolkovsky, the precursor of astronautics, is located in front of the obelisk.
 The State Museum of the History of Cosmonautics in Kaluga now bears his name. His residence during the final months of his life (also in Kaluga) was converted into a memorial museum a year after his death.
 The town Uglegorsk in Amur Oblast was renamed Tsiolkovsky by President of Russia Vladimir Putin in 2015. 
 The crater Tsiolkovskiy (the most prominent crater on the far side of the Moon) was named after him, while asteroid 1590 Tsiolkovskaja was named after his wife. (The Soviet Union obtained naming rights by operating Luna 3, the first space device to successfully transmit images of the side of the Moon not seen from Earth.)
 The Tsiolkovsky Memorial Apartment. A museum created in Borovsk where he lived and had started his career as a teacher.
 There is a statue of Konstantin Tsiolkovsky directly outside the Sir Thomas Brisbane Planetarium in Brisbane, Queensland, Australia.
 There is a Google Doodle honoring the famous pioneer.
 There is a Tsiolkovsky exhibit on display at the Museum of Jurassic Technology in Los Angeles, California.
There is a 1 ruble 1987 coin commemorating the 130th anniversary of Konstantin Tsiolkovsky's birth.

In popular culture

 Tsiolkovsky was consulted for the script to the 1936 Soviet science-fiction film, Kosmicheskiy reys.
 In Altman's 1979 post-apocalyptic film Quintet, the motto of the charity house run by the character St. Christopher is taken from Tsiolkovsky: "The Earth is the cradle of the mind, but one cannot live in the cradle forever."
 In 1972 science fiction movie Solaris directed by Andrey Tarkovski, a portrait of Tsiolkovsky appears, soon after the beginning of the movie, decorating the wall of the meeting room of the committee discussing the future of `solaristics'.
 Science-fiction writer Alexander Belyaev's novel  features a city and space station named with Tsiolkovsky's initials.
 A lunar station is named Tsiolkovsky in Stanisław Lem's novel Tales of Pirx the Pilot, story "The Conditional Reflex".
 The Soviet ship in Harry Turtledove's 1990 Mars exploration novel A World of Difference is named Tsiolkovsky.
 In Princeton physicist and space colony advocate Gerard K. O'Neill's 1981 book of futurism, 2081: A Hopeful View of the Human Future, the protagonist rides a spaceship named the Konstantin Tsiolokovsky from his home in a space colony at twice the orbital radius of Pluto to the Earth of 2081.
 A space station is named Tsiolkovsky 1 in William Gibson's 1981 short story "Hinterlands".
 The character Aeolia Schenberg in the anime series Mobile Suit Gundam 00 is based on Tsiolkovsky.
 The Zvezda module of the International Space Station has photos of Tsiolkovsky and Yuri Gagarin posted on the wall above the aft hatchway.
 The Mars-based space elevators in the Horus Heresy novel Mechanicum by Graham McNeill, set in the Warhammer 40k universe, are called "Tsiolkovsky Towers".
 The science ship, SS Tsiolkovsky (NCC-53911) in the 1987 Star Trek: The Next Generation episode "The Naked Now" is named after him.
 Episode eight of Denpa Onna to Seishun Otoko is called "Tsiolkovsky's Prayer".
 In the comic book series Assassin's Creed: The Fall, the leader of the Assassin Order reads from The Will of the Universe.
 In a 2015 episode of Murdoch Mysteries, set in about 1905, James Pendrick works with Tsiolkovsky's daughter to build a suborbital rocket based on his ideas and be the first man in space; a second rocket built to the same design is adapted as a ballistic missile for purposes of extortion.
 In the 2015 video game SOMA, which deals with topics of transhumanism, a character, Neil Tsiolkovsky, is likely named after him.

Works

See also
 Cosmonauts Alley, a Russian monument park where Tsiolkovsky is honored
 History of the internal combustion engine
 Robert Esnault-Pelterie, a Frenchman who independently arrived at Tsiolkovsky's rocket equation
 Russian cosmism
 Russian philosophy
 Soviet space program
 Timeline of hydrogen technologies

Citations

Cited sources

Further reading
  Review
 Georgiy Stepanovich Vetrov (1994). S. P. Korolyov and Space: First steps. M. Nauka. .

External links

 Konstantin Tsiolkovsky. The collection of philosophical works. Biography, books, audiobooks, articles, photographs, video. Russian and English. 
 Tsiolkovsky's house The house museum of Tsiolkovsky
 Virtual Matchbox Labels Museum – Russian labels – Space – Page 2 – Konstantin Tsiolkovsky Historic images
 Tsiolkovsky from Russianspaceweb.com
 Spaceflight or Extinction: Konstantin Tsiolkovsky Excerpts from "The Aims of Astronautics", The Call of the Cosmos
 The Foundations of the Space Age: The Life and Work of Tsiolkovskiy, by Vladimir V. Lytkin, Tsiolkovskiy Museum, Kaluga.
 Tsiolkovski: The Cosmic Scientist and His Cosmic Philosophy by Daniel H. Shubin. 
 The Path to the Stars: Collection of Science Fiction Works
 The Call of the Cosmos

 
1857 births
1935 deaths
Cosmists
Early rocketry
Early spaceflight scientists
People from Spassky District, Ryazan Oblast
People from Spassky Uyezd (Ryazan Governorate)
Philosophers of technology
Philosophical cosmologists
Recipients of the Order of Saint Stanislaus (Russian), 3rd class
Recipients of the Order of St. Anna, 3rd class
Rocket science pioneers
Rocket scientists
Russian aerospace engineers
Russian atheists
Russian inventors
Russian people of Polish descent
Russian people of Tatar descent
Russian science fiction writers
Soviet aerospace engineers
Scientists with disabilities